Leonard Horridge (18 August 1907 – 1 September 1976) was an English cricketer. Horridge was a right-handed batsman who bowled right-arm off break. He was born at Adlington, Lancashire.

Horridge made two first-class appearances for Lancashire in the 1927 County Championship, against Northamptonshire and Leicestershire, and a further first-class appearance against the Minor Counties in 1930, scoring a total of 33 runs at an average of 16.50, while with the ball he took 3 wickets at a bowling average of 26.33, with best figures of 2/46. Although these were his only first-class appearances for the county, he did represent the county Second XI in the Minor Counties Championship, making 42 appearances from 1927 to 1930. This also allowed him to be selected for a combined Minor Counties team, making two first-class appearances for it, against the touring West Indians in 1928 and Lancashire in 1930, scoring a total of 24 runs.

He died at Preston, Lancashire, on 1 September 1976.

References

External links
Leonard Horridge at ESPNcricinfo
Leonard Horridge at CricketArchive

1907 births
1976 deaths
People from Adlington, Lancashire
English cricketers
Lancashire cricketers
Minor Counties cricketers